The discography of Russell Watson, a British operatic and pop tenor, consists of fourteen studio albums, six compilation albums, seven singles, and a number of other appearances.

Watson's debut album, The Voice, was released in September 2000. A mixture of operatic arias and covers of pop songs, it topped the UK Classical Chart and eventually reached number five in the UK Albums Chart. Later, when released in the United States, the album took the number one spot and made history as the first time a British artist had held both the US and UK classical number one. The album contained a collaboration with former Happy Mondays singer Shaun Ryder, who lent his vocals to the Freddie Mercury and Montserrat Caballé song "Barcelona". The album also featured a duet with Cleo of girl group Cleopatra on the song "Someone Like You". Cleo later duetted with Russell again on his third album Reprise on the song "The Best That Love Can Be".

In late 2002, Watson released the single, "Nothing Sacred – A Song for Kirsty", to raise money for the Francis House children's hospice in Didsbury, Manchester. The campaign to raise £5 million was fronted by Kirsty Howard, a seven-year-old girl with a serious heart defect. The song reached number 17 in the UK Singles Chart.

The self-styled "People's Tenor", who is also known as "The Voice" after his first album, won the Album of the Year at the Classical BRIT Awards in both 2001 and 2002, also collecting awards for Best-Selling Debut Album (2001) and Best-Selling Album (2002).

Watson collaborated with Welsh singer Aled Jones for albums released in 2018, 2019 and 2022. Their most recent album, Christmas with Aled and Russell was released in November 2022 and charted at number 14 on the UK Albums chart.

Albums

Studio albums

Compilation albums

Singles

Video albums

References

Watson, Russell